Brickellia lancifolia is a Mexican species of flowering plants in the family Asteraceae. It is native to southern Mexico in the state of Oaxaca.

Brickellia lancifolia is a branching shrub up to 240 cm (8 feet) tall. Its leaves partially surround the stems. The plant produces many small, nodding (hanging) flower heads with purple disc florets but no ray florets.

References

External links
Photo of herbarium specimen at Missouri Botanical Garden, collected in Oaxaca, isotype of Brickellia lancifolia

lancifolia
Flora of Oaxaca
Plants described in 1895